Gnel also known as Gnelus (flourished 4th century - died August, 359) was a Prince from the Arsacid dynasty of Armenia.

Gnel was the son of Tiridates by an unnamed mother who was the daughter of Gnel, hence his paternal uncle was Arsaces II (Arshak II) who ruled as Roman Client King of Armenia from 350 until 368 and was a grandson to the previous ruling Roman Client Armenian King Tiran (Tigranes VII) who ruled from 339 until 350.

Gnel was most probably born and raised during the reign of Tiran. Sometime during the reign of his paternal grandfather, the Sassanid King Shapur II launched a war on Rome and her allies, firstly by persecuting the Christians that lived in Persia and Mesopotamia. Shapur II's war by capturing these territories began to dealt a severe blow to Roman prestige in the East. Eventually the Sassanid King with his army had invaded Armenia, taking the members of the royal family including Gnel as hostages as they were betrayed to Shapur II by Tiran's chamberlain. Gnel with all members of his family had become Sassanid political prisoners in which his paternal grandfather was blinded and thrown into prison after Shapur II accused Tiran of collusion with Rome.

The nobles of Armenia were infuriated by the brutality of Shapur II and his treatment of the Armenian royal family, took up arms and fought against Shapur II and his army with assistance from the Romans. They successfully drove Shapur II and his army out from Armenia. After Shapur II was defeated, he had signed a treaty and Gnel with members of his family were released from prison. As Tiran being depressed and blinded from his experience in captivity, had abdicated his throne and Arsaces II succeeded Tiran as Armenian King in 350.

During the reign of Arsaces II, Gnel was a popular prince in Armenia and could have been seen as a potential successor to his uncle. The below surviving inscription reveals the popularity of Gnel; his high standing within the Arsacid dynasty and within Armenian society:
 great Arsacid sepuh or mec sepuhn Arsakuni

Sepuh means in Armenian nobleman or gentlemen. From the inscription it appears that Gnel was designated a royal title within the context of the local aristocracy and feudal system and also appears that his royal title was denoted to all members of great families in Armenia other than the family heads.

Gnel had married an Armenian noblewoman called Pharantzem of Siwnik’ (Siunik) from the Siunia Dynasty. Pharantzem was extremely well known for her beauty and modesty. Her reputation for her beauty had become renowned and widespread to the point as Gnel's paternal cousin Tirit had become passionately in love with her and desired her to be his wife.

Finding a way to plot against his cousin Gnel, Tirit approached their uncle Arsaces II and said to him: “Gnel wants to rule, and to kill you. All the grandees, the Naxarars and the Azats like Gnel and all the Naxarars of the land prefer his lordship over them than yours. Now they say, ‘look and see what you do, king, so that you can save yourself”. Believing the words of Tirit, Arsaces II became agitated and did confirm the statements of Tirit.

Arsaces II from then until Gnel's death had a grudge against Gnel which he had frequently tried to persecute and plot treachery against him for a long time. From that moment Gnel was on the run with his wife from his uncle.

Death
Arsaces II did eventually kill Gnel around the time of the festival of Navasard as his falsely lured his nephew and his wife into Shahapivan - a native camping place of the Arsacids which was below a walled hunting preserve - based on a lie that Arsaces II wanted to reconcile with Gnel. When Gnel was captured by Arsaces II's soldiers he was taken to a nearby hill of the mountain called Lsin where he was executed. After the death and burial of Gnel, Arsaces II issued an order to mourn the death of his nephew which Arsaces II weep and mourn for Gnel greatly while Pharantzem mourned so much for Gnel she tore off her clothes, was screaming and cried so much.

Now Tirit had successfully got rid of his cousin, he was unable to control his lust for Pharantzem. Tirit had sent his messenger to Pharantzem a note reading: “Do not mourn so much, for I am a better man that he was. I loved you and therefore betrayed him to death, so that I could take you in marriage”. In her mourning Pharantzem, raised a protest, pulling out her hair and screaming as she mourned that her husband died because of her.

When the Armenians in particular Arsaces II heard the cries of Pharantzem, Arsaces II began to realise the plotting of Tirit and the senseless death of Gnel. Arsaces II was stunned in what happened and had regretted in killing Gnel. For a while Arsaces II, didn't do anything to Tirit. Tirit had sent a message to Arsaces II stating, “King, I want you to order that I be allowed to marry Gnel’s wife”. As Arsaces II heard this he said: “Now I know for sure that what I have heard is accurate. Gnel’s death occurred for his wife”. Arsaces II planned to kill Tirit in return for Gnel's murder. When Tirit heard this, he was in so much fear for Arsaces II he fled at night. Arsaces II was informed that Tirit had left and ordered his soldiers to find Tirit and kill him. His soldiers found Tirit in the forests in the district of Basen and killed him there.

References

Sources
 Faustus of Byzantium, History of the Armenians, 5th Century 
 Encyclopaedia Iranica: Armenia and Iran II. The pre-Islamic period
 R.G. Hovannisian, The Armenian People From Ancient to Modern Times, Volume I: The Dynastic Periods: From Antiquity to the Fourteenth Century, Palgrave Macmillan, 2004 
 V.M. Kurkjian, A History of Armenia, Indo-European Publishing, 2008
 E. Gibbon, The History of the Decline and Fall of the Roman Empire (Google eBook), MobileReference, 2009

Arsacid dynasty of Armenia
4th-century Armenian people